Ewell Station, a later station of the Butterfield Overland Mail located 24.4 miles east of Dragoon Springs, Arizona and 12.22 miles west of Apache Pass Station.  This station shortened the route between Dragoon Springs and Apache Pass Stations and provided a water stop not previously available. The station was probably started in late 1858 as it is not listed in Oct., 1858  but appears in an account from 1862, after Butterfield had ceased operation. Water at the station was hauled from a spring, located 4 miles north of the station in the Dos Cabezas Mountains and stored in a cistern.

References

History of Arizona
Butterfield Overland Mail in New Mexico Territory
Former populated places in Cochise County, Arizona